Basay may refer to:

 Basay, Negros Oriental, Philippines
 Basay language, an extinct East Formosan language
 Basay people, an ethnic group in Taiwan
 Ivo Basay (born 1966), Chilean footballer

See also

 Basai
 Basey
 Bazay